

References

 
Supermarkets
Iceland